Tepequém is a remote and sparsely populated (2010) village in eastern Amajari, Roraima, Brazil. Diamonds were discovered near the village in the 1930s. The village can be reached by road from the RR-203. The economy is based on tourism.

Serro de Tepequém (Tepequém Mountain Range) 
The village of Tepequém is surrounded by Serro de Tepequém. Serro de Tepequém is a tepui about 1,100 metres above sea level at its plateau, its highest point.

References 

Populated places in Roraima